Charles Russell Cooke (28 February 1836 – 20 February 1892) was an English first-class cricketer and clergyman.

The son of the Reverend James Young Cooke, he was born in February 1836 at Chelsworth, Suffolk. He was educated at both Ipswich School and Eton College, before going up to Clare College, Cambridge. While studying at Cambridge, he played first-class cricket for Cambridge University Cricket Club in 1858, making four appearances including in The University Match against Oxford at Lord's, gaining him his cricket blue. He also played for Cambridgeshire in the same year against Surrey at The Oval. He scored 61 runs in his five first-class matches, with a highest score of 23.

After graduating from Cambridge, he took holy orders in the Anglican Church in 1859. His first ecclesiastical post was as a priest at Ely Cathedral in 1860. Later in 1860, he became curate at Great Bradley, a post he held until 1864 when he became vicar at Haveringland. He was vicar there until 1875, when he succeeded his father as rector of Semer. Cooke died suddenly at Semer in February 1892.

References

External links

1836 births
1892 deaths
19th-century English Anglican priests
Alumni of Clare College, Cambridge
Cambridge Town Club cricketers
Cambridge University cricketers
English cricketers
People educated at Eton College
People educated at Ipswich School
People from Babergh District